State Route 141 (SR 141) is a  state highway in the southeastern part of the U.S. state of Alabama. The highway travels from SR 189 southeast of Elba north to U.S. Route 331 (US 331) and SR 9 south of Brantley.

Route description
SR 141 begins at an intersection with SR 189 in rural Coffee County, southeast of Elba. From here, the highway heads north-northwest through farmland until it intersects US 84 (internally designated as SR 12); the two highways share a brief concurrency. SR 141 continues north past this intersection and meets SR 166 at its western terminus in Danleys Crossroads. Past this intersection, SR 141 heads north through a rural area before turning northwest and entering Crenshaw County. The highway runs northwest from here to its terminus, an intersection with US 331 (internally designated as SR 9) south of Brantley.

Major intersections

See also

References

141
Transportation in Coffee County, Alabama
Transportation in Crenshaw County, Alabama